The 1998–99 Buffalo Sabres season was the Sabres' 29th season in the National Hockey League. Miroslav Satan scored 40 goals and the Sabres would add influential centers Stu Barnes and Joe Juneau from the Pittsburgh Penguins and Washington Capitals, respectively. Michal Grosek had the best season of his career, and the team finally returned to the Stanley Cup Final, which was a losing effort against the Dallas Stars.

Off-season
In the 1998 NHL Entry Draft, the Sabres picked Dmitri Kalinin with their first-round pick, 18th overall.

Regular season

Season standings

Schedule and results

Playoffs
1999 Stanley Cup playoffs

Eastern Conference Quarterfinals

Eastern Conference semifinals

Eastern Conference finals
The Toronto Maple Leafs and Buffalo Sabres met in the 1999 Eastern Conference Finals. The Maple Leafs were coming off a six-game series win over the Pittsburgh Penguins, while the Sabres were coming off a six-game series win themselves, over the Boston Bruins. Toronto was having its best playoff since 1994, when they last made a conference final series. Buffalo, on the other hand, was in the third round for the second consecutive year.

In Game 1, Dwayne Roloson filled in for injured Sabres goaltender Dominik Hasek at the Air Canada Centre in Toronto. Leading 3–2 midway through the game, Toronto appeared to be in control, but Stu Barnes tied the game for Buffalo at 14:37 of the second period. The Sabres went on to score twice in the third period, on goals by Curtis Brown at 5:21 and Geoff Sanderson at 11:02. Steve Thomas' goal with 6:01 remaining in the game brought Toronto to within one, but Buffalo held on to win 5–4. Roloson impressed the critics, stopping 28 of 32 shots.

In Game 2, the Maple Leafs scored two goals 18 seconds apart in the first period, as Steve Sullivan scored at 10:28 followed by Sylvain Cote at 10:46. With just over ten minutes to go in the game, Toronto held a 4–3 lead with Buffalo pressing. Steve Thomas' goal at with 7:43 to go gave the Maple Leafs a 5–3 lead and Garry Valk sealed the 6–3 win with an empty-net goal at 19:30.

With series tied at 1–1, the two teams traveled south to the Marine Midland Arena in Buffalo for Games 3 and 4. Dominik Hasek returned for the Sabres in game three, but it was the away team that netted the first goal, as Maple Leafs forward Yanic Perreault scored at 16:08 of the first period. But Buffalo was not to be denied, and they scored three goals in the first 7:38 of the second period. Alexander Karpovtsev scored at 13:09 of the second to pull the Maple Leafs to within one, but they could not score the equalizer and Curtis Brown iced the game with an empty-net goal at 19:31 of the third period and the Sabres won, 4–2. Dominik Hasek made 24 saves in the victory.

Buffalo came out flying again in Game 4, holding a 5–0 lead after two periods. Hasek's shutout bid was erased when Mats Sundin scored on a penalty shot at 6:59. He scored again with 1:57 remaining in the game as Buffalo won, 5–2. This time, Hasek made 31 saves.

In Game 5 at the Air Canada Centre on May 31, the Sabres looked to advance to the Stanley Cup Finals for the first time since 1975. After a scoreless first period, Steve Sullivan got Toronto on the board first just 33 seconds into the second. After goals by Curtis Brown, Kris King and Vaclav Varada, the game was tied 2–2 after two periods. Erik Rasmussen broke the tie with a goal at 11:35 of the third period. With less than two minutes remaining, the Maple Leafs got a power play and pulled Joseph to get a six-on-four situation, but could not score on Hasek. Dixon Ward added a shorthanded empty-net goal with 1:02 remaining as the Sabres went on to win 4–2 and take the series four games to one. With the victory, they advanced to the Stanley Cup Finals for the first time since 1975.

Stanley Cup Final

"No Goal!"
In Game 6, Dallas Stars winger Brett Hull's triple-overtime goal — as Hull's skate was visibly in Dominik Hasek's crease — ended the series, and the Stars were awarded the Cup. In 1999, it was illegal to score a goal if an offensive player's skate entered the crease before the puck did. At the time, even Dallas Morning News hockey writer Keith Gave questioned the legality of the goal. NHL officials, however, maintained that Hull's two shots in the goal mouth constituted a single possession of the puck since the puck deflected off Hasek, and their ruling stood, citing that they "were going to change the rule the following year anyway."  It is widely speculated that, by the time the Sabres mentioned the foul, the red carpet had already been unrolled at center ice, and the officials refused to acknowledge the non-call, also due to NHL Commissioner Gary Bettman's desires to see a team "South of the Mason–Dixon line" hoist the Stanley Cup. ESPN has ranked the call as the fifth worst officiating call in sports history. Conversely, Al Strachan of the Toronto Sun wrote, "There should have been no controversy whatsoever. When Hull first kicked the rebound on to his stick, he had neither foot in the crease. At the instant he kicked the puck, he became in control of it. It was only in the follow-through of that kick that his left foot moved into the crease." Buffalo sports fans, who have suffered through some of the biggest misfortunes in sports history (such as "Wide Right" and "Music City Miracle"), refer to the game as "No Goal," a phrase still used in western New York to this day, even having bumper stickers saying the phrase. The rule was changed for the following season, allowing players to be inside the goaltender's crease as long as they do not interfere with the goalie.

Player statistics

Forwards
Note: GP = Games played; G = Goals; A = Assists; Pts = Points; PIM = Penalty minutes

* – player was traded during season; stats only include games played with Buffalo

Defensemen
Note: GP = Games played; G = Goals; A = Assists; Pts = Points; PIM = Penalty minutes

* – player was traded during season; stats only include games played with Buffalo

Goaltending
Note: GP = Games played; W = Wins; L = Losses; T = Ties; SO = Shutouts; GAA = Goals against average

Awards and records
 Prince of Wales Trophy
 Dominik Hasek, Nominee, Hart Memorial Trophy
 Dominik Hasek, Nominee, Lester B. Pearson Trophy
 Dominik Hasek, Vezina Trophy
 Dominik Hasek, NHL First Team All-Star

NHL All-Star Game
 Dominik Hasek, World Team

Transactions

Draft picks

References
Bibliography
 
 Sabres on Hockey Database

B
B
Buffalo Sabres seasons
Eastern Conference (NHL) championship seasons
Bu
Buffalo
Buffalo